Michael Wilson Hardy (born September 13, 1990), known professionally as HARDY. Is an American country music singer and songwriter. He has written songs for Florida Georgia Line, Chris Lane, Blake Shelton, Dallas Smith, Thomas Rhett, and Morgan Wallen. He released his debut album A Rock for Big Loud Records, as well as the mixtape Hixtape, Vol. 1. He has charted the singles "Rednecker" and "One Beer" and was featured on "Some Things Never Change".

Early life
Michael Wilson Hardy was born September 13, 1990, to Mike and Sarah Hardy, in Philadelphia, Mississippi. Hardy initially fell in love with music because of his dad. Growing up, he would often listen to music with his father, which he has cited as the source of some of his earliest and fondest memories. The love of music grew from there, but did not become a major goal of his until he was older.

He attended Neshoba Central High School in Philadelphia, Mississippi. It was during that time that he wrote his first song to "impress a girl." Hardy then went on to attend Middle Tennessee State University, where he got a degree in songwriting in the Recording Industry Management program.

After graduating, Hardy took a trip to visit his sister, in Nashville, which led to the start of his career. While there, he realized that it was possible to make country music into a career. Hardy met Florida Georgia Line in 2012 at a party where he was introduced to them by a mutual acquaintance. He was eventually reconnected with the group years later.

After moving to Nashville, Tennessee, to pursue songwriting, he became a writing partner of the duo Florida Georgia Line. Among the songs that Hardy wrote include "Up Down" by Morgan Wallen. Due to the song's success and encouragement from record producer Joey Moi, Hardy was signed to Big Loud Records in 2018.

Career 
In October 2018, he released an EP titled This Ole Boy, which he promoted by joining Wallen's If I Know Me Tour. This was followed in 2019 by the single "Rednecker", and a second EP titled Where to Find Me. To support the EP, Hardy joined Florida Georgia Line on their Can't Say I Ain't Country Tour.

Hardy also co-wrote Florida Georgia Line's singles "Simple" and "Talk You Out of It", Blake Shelton's singles "God's Country" and "Hell Right", "Drop" by Dallas Smith, Chris Lane's single "I Don't Know About You", and Jameson Rodgers' debut single "Some Girls".

In September 2019, Hardy released a collaborative mixtape titled Hixtape, Vol. 1, which featured a total of 17 artists including Thomas Rhett, Keith Urban, Tracy Lawrence, Jake Owen, Trace Adkins, Joe Diffie, Zakk Wylde, Cole Swindell, Dustin Lynch, and Morgan Wallen.

Hardy was set to be on tour with Thomas Rhett in 2020 for Rhett's Center Point Road Tour, but the tour was postponed due to the COVID-19 pandemic. In September 2020, Hardy released his debut album A Rock, which included his single "One Beer". He was also featured on Dallas Smith’s single "Some Things Never Change". In June 2021, he was featured on the Brantley Gilbert single "The Worst Country Song of All Time". In July 2021, he was featured on Dierks Bentley's single "Beers on Me", which he co-wrote.

He later toured with Sean Stemaly in 2021 and created Hixtape Volume 2. This album included artists such as Matt Stell, Jon Pardi, Jimmie Allen, Colt Ford, Randy Houser, Rhett Akins, and Lainey Wilson. In the Fall of 2021, Hardy went on tour with Jason Aldean, as well. The "Back in the Saddle" tour kicked off in August 2021, and included Lainey Wilson, in addition to Hardy.

Morgan Wallen announced his plans for his 2022 Dangerous tour, which included Hardy for almost all of the nearly 50 stops, including stops in Pennsylvania, South Carolina, Georgia, Louisiana, Oklahoma, and South Dakota.

In October 2022, Hardy announced that his album, The Mockingbird & The Crow, would be released on January 20, 2023, via Big Loud Records with guest vocals from fellow country singers Morgan Wallen & Lainey Wilson and A Day to Remember lead singer Jeremy McKinnon.

Hardy released 3 songs from the mockingbird & THE CROW on October 9, 2022:  "TRUCK BED", "here lies country music", and "mockingbird & THE CROW", the final of which marks a distinct shift from the Country to the Rock genre.

Awards 
In 2019, Hardy received his first nomination for the Country Music Association awards. Held at the Bridgestone Arena in Nashville, Tennessee, Hardy was nominated for Song of the Year for Blake Shelton's "God's Country", which Hardy co-wrote with Devin Dawson and Jordan Schmidt. He was then again nominated in the 2021 CMA Awards as New Artist of the Year. Hardy has yet to win a CMA award.

Hardy was nominated for two awards in the 2020 Academy of Country Music Awards: Song of the Year, for Blake Shelton's "Gods Country" that Hardy co-wrote, and Songwriter of the Year. Following that, in 2021, he received three nominations: New Male Artist, Songwriter of the Year, and Music Event of the Year, for his song "One Beer" along with Lauren Alaina and Devin Dawson. Hardy was nominated for two awards in the 2022 Academy of Country Music Awards, held at the Allegiant Stadium in Las Vegas. He did not win the award for New Male Artist, losing to Parker McCollum. He was, however, named the Academy of Country Music's 2022 Songwriter of the Year, making that his first ACM Award.

Personal life 
Hardy proposed to his now wife Caleigh Ryan in August 2021 at The Lyric in Oxford, Mississippi which is where the couple met in 2017. The two married on October 29, 2022.

Back-up band

Current line-up 
 Rhett Smith - guitar, backing vocals
 Justin Loose - guitar, backing vocals
 Harry Miree - drums, percussion

Past members 
 Jacob Durett - drums, percussion

Discography

Albums

Mixtapes

Extended plays

Singles

As lead artist

As featured artist

Other charted and certified songs

Music videos

Awards and nominations

Notes

References

American male singer-songwriters
American country singer-songwriters
Big Loud artists
Country musicians from Mississippi
1990 births
Living people
People from Philadelphia, Mississippi
Singer-songwriters from Mississippi